Lombard Road power station supplied electricity to the Battersea area of South-East London from 1901 to 1972. It was owned and operated by the Borough of Battersea until the nationalisation of the electricity supply industry in 1948. The power station was redeveloped several times: including the incorporation of new plant in the 1910s and the 1930s. The station was decommissioned in 1972.

History
In 1896 the Vestry of Battersea applied for a Provisional Order under the Electric Lighting Acts to generate and supply electricity to the parish. This was granted by the Board of Trade and was confirmed by Parliament through the Electric Lighting Orders Confirmation (No. 5) Act 1896 (59 & 60  Vict. c. cxix). The power station was built between Lombard Road and Harroway Road in Battersea (51°28'16"N 0°10'37"W).

Equipment specification
In 1923 the generating plant comprised:

Coal-fired boilers generating up to 207,000 lb/h (26.1 kg/s) of steam, the boilers fed steam to:

 Generators:
 1 × 850 kW reciprocating engine driving a DC generator,
 1 × 1,500 kW steam turbine driving a DC generator,
 2 × 5,000 kW steam turbo-alternators (AC).

The total generating capacity was 12,350 kW.

A variety of electricity current was available to consumers:

 Direct current at 230 and 460 Volts,
 3-phase, 50 Hz AC at 400 Volts,
 3-phase, 50 Hz AC at 6,000 Volts for industrial users.

New plant 1930s
A new generator and switch house were added to the power station in 1931.

By 1954 the plant at Lombard Road was in its final configuration and comprised:

 Boilers:
 4 × Babcock and Wilcox boilers with chain grate stokers, each 65,000 lb/h (8.2 kg/s), steam conditions 315 psi and 750 °F (21.7 bar, 400 °C),
 2 × Babcock and Wilcox boilers with chain grate stokers, each 125,000 lb/h (15.75 kg/s), steam conditions 315 psi and 750 °F (21.7 bar, 400 °C),

The boilers had a total evaporative capacity of 510,000 lb/h (64.3 kg/s).

Coal was delivered by road and by barge to Grove Wharf on the Thames. From the wharf it was delivered to the power station by an inclined conveyor across Lombard Road.

The boilers supplied steam to:

 Turbo-alternators:
 1 × Westinghouse 5 MW turbo-alternator, low pressure set, generating at 6.6 kV. Steam at 190 psi and 520 °F (13.1 bar and 271 °C) via a reducing valve.
 1 × Fraser & Chalmers-GEC 5 MW turbo-alternator, low pressure set, generating at 6.6 kV. Steam at 190 psi and 520 °F (13.1 bar and 271 °C) via a reducing valve.
 1 × Fraser & Chalmers-GEC 30 MW turbo-alternator, high pressure set, generating at 6.6 kV,
 1 × Fraser & Chalmers-GEC 10 MW turbo-alternator, high pressure set, generating at 6.6 kV,

The completed total installed generating capacity was 50 MW, with an output capacity of 42 MW.

Condenser cooling water was drawn from the River Thames.

Operations

Operating data 1904–20
The operating data for the period 1904–20 is shown in the table.

Operating data 1921–24
A breakdown of the operating data for the period 1921–24 is shown in the table:

The growth of demand and use of electricity is evident.

Under the terms of the Electricity (Supply) Act 1926 (16-17 Geo. 5 c. 51) the Central Electricity Board (CEB) was established in 1926.  The CEB identified high efficiency ‘selected’ power stations that would supply electricity most effectively; Lombard Road was designated a selected station. The CEB also constructed the national grid (1927–33) to connect power stations within a region.

Operating data 1934–46
Lombard Road power station operating data for 1934–46 is given below.

The larger amount of electricity supplied reflects the capacity of the new generating plant installed in the early 1930s.

The British electricity supply industry was nationalised in 1948 under the provisions of the Electricity Act 1947 (10-11 Geo. 6 c. 54). The Borough of Battersea electricity undertaking was abolished, ownership of Lombard Road power station was vested in the British Electricity Authority, and subsequently the Central Electricity Authority and the Central Electricity Generating Board (CEGB). At the same time the electricity distribution and sales responsibilities of the Battersea electricity undertaking were transferred to the London Electricity Board (LEB).

Operating data 1954–71
Operating data for the period 1954–71 is shown in the table:

The declining use of the station at lower thermal efficiencies is evident.

The amount of electricity (in GWh) supplied by Lombard Road power station over its operating life was:

Closure
Lombard Road power station was decommissioned in 1972. The buildings were subsequently demolished and the area has been redeveloped with housing and commercial units.

See also
 Timeline of the UK electricity supply industry
 List of power stations in England

References

Coal-fired power stations in England
Demolished power stations in the United Kingdom
Former power stations in England
Former power stations in London
Power stations on the River Thames